Neil Richard Balnaves  (5 May 1944 – 21 February 2022) was an Australian media executive and arts philanthropist. His production companies were responsible for bringing  Big Brother and Bananas in Pyjamas to Australian television screens.

He turned to philanthropy after a life-threatening accident in 2002, and founded the Balnaves Foundation in 2006, which by the time of his death had given  to arts organisations.

Early life
Neil Richard Balnaves was born on 5 May 1944 in Adelaide, South Australia. He grew up in Penola in the south-east of the state, and had polio as a teenager, which crippled his right arm. His family's neighbours were  Aboriginal, and he grew up with a positive perception of Indigenous Australians.

Career
Balnaves' media career started in advertising, in Adelaide in 1960, moving into senior roles in production companies.

Balnaves worked in the media industry for over 60 years. He founded the Southern Star Group in 1988, and was executive chairman of the company. The company later went through various mergers and incarnations, becoming Endemol Australia in 2013/2014, Southern Star was responsible for bringing shows such as Water Rats, and McLeod's Daughters, Big Brother and Bananas in Pyjamas to Australian television screens.

From 2003 until 2016 he was chair of the Ardent Leisure Group, responsible for running theme parks such as Dreamworld in Queensland. Other directorships included Hanna-Barbera Australia and the Taft-Hardie Group.

Other roles
Chancellor of Charles Darwin University, 2016–2018
Director and Trustee Member of Bond University
Board member of the Art Gallery of South Australia, 2013–2019
Member of the Advisory Council and Dean's Circle at the UNSW Faculty of Medicine
Director of the Sydney Orthopaedic Research Institute
Member of the Chairmans Circle at 'Sydney Theatre Company
Foundation Fellow of the Australian Institute of Company Directors
Served various advisory and community organisations

Honours
2009: Honorary doctorate of the Bond University
2010: Appointed an Officer of the Order of Australia, "for  service to the community through philanthropic support for the arts, education, medical research and Indigenous programs, and to business" in the Australia Day Honours
2010: Honorary doctorate of the University of New South Wales

Death and legacy
Balnaves died on 21 February 2022 in a boating accident while holidaying with his wife, Diane, in Tahiti. He was survived by Diane and children Hamish and Victoria. Their sister Alexandra had died after a long illness in 2019.

Philanthropy and interests

Influences
It was after a near-death experience caused by a boating accident on the Gold Coast, Queensland in 2002 that Balnaves turned to philanthropy. He sustained injuries which caused pain and inhibited his ability to travel, so he sold Endemol.

He married Diane in 1971, and he ascribes his love of arts to her influence. Growing up with polio, and being on life support for a while and not being able to walk for a year after his 2002 boating accident led to an interest in health and medicine. Having Aboriginal neighbours as a child fostered his interest in Indigenous cultures of Australia.

Balnaves Foundation
Balnaves established the Balnaves Foundation in 2006, to support the arts, education, and research into medical and social justice issues in Australia. Balnaves said that it was important to him that the foundation focused on "Indigenous Australia, young people and the disadvantaged" in order to help create "a better Australia".

It has given donations to many Australian arts organisations, including the Ensemble Theatre, Bangarra Dance Theatre, the Sydney Biennale, the Art Gallery of New South Wales (AGNSW) the Art Gallery of South Australia (AGSA),  the National Gallery of Australia (NGA) and TarraWarra Museum of Art. It also awarded a grant to Guardian Australia specifically for "in-depth reporting on Indigenous affairs, and an in-depth reporting project on Australian arts".

Balnaves also helped to fund Sculpture by the Sea in Sydney, and Australian presentations at the Venice Biennale in a partnership with the Australia Council. He supported the START program  at AGSA in Adelaide, giving families with children access to gallery events each week. He believed that governments' attitude towards the arts had deteriorated, and that politicians tended to regard the arts as elitist, and as a consequence funding had decreased enormously. In a 2013 interview, he called the current crop of politicians as a "bunch of philistines". he believed that the arts should be available to all, and that private philanthropists should be proud of supporting the arts.

Around 2007, he provided funding to subsidise tickets to eight shows at the Sydney Opera House per year, for welfare recipients and pensioners to access the arts there.

In 2010, the Balnaves Foundation Australian Sculpture Archive was established at AGNSW "to acquire the archives of major Australian sculptors and to extend research in three-dimensional practice".

In 2011, the foundation started providing support for two Indigenous-led works per year at Belvoir St Theatre in Sydney. It also created the Balnaves Award (won by Nakkiah Lui in its inaugural year, and later Leah Purcell and Ursula Yovich), which has since evolved into the Balnaves Fellowship.

In 2017, Balnaves supported the Adelaide Festival, then under the directorship of Rachel Healy and Neil Armfield, and started the "Tix for Next to Nix" program, which still runs today. In 2022,  was allocated across a number of events, enabling people with a Pension or Health Care Card ro purchase tickets for $5 each.

In 2020, the Balnaves Foundation gave A$1.25 million to the Indigenous Law Centre at UNSW to establish a term chair, known as the Balnaves Chair in Constitutional Law, to allow Professor Megan Davis to continue the work of the Uluru Statement from the Heart. The chair was named in honour of Alexandra Balnaves, who died in 2019. The foundation had had a long relationship with UNSW, by 2020 having given almost A$5.5 million, which included allocations for Indigenous medical scholarships and for funding the UNSW Indigenous Law Centre. 

Nick Mitzevich, NGA director, said  of Balnaves: "The beauty of his philanthropy was to leverage and do more with the support he gave to make it bigger and better. He was never a passive philanthropist". The Balnaves Contemporary Series supported major annual commissions of contemporary artists from 2018 onwards. 

Others to benefit from the foundation's philanthropy are:
St Vincent's Hospital, Sydney
Black Dog Institute
Story Factory
NIDA's First Nations Program

People
All three of Neil and Diane Balnaves' children worked for the foundation, and after Neil's death, Diane, Hamish and Victoria continued to work for the foundation, along with a daughter of Alexandra, Caillean Honor.

Footnotes

References

External links

1944 births
2022 deaths
21st-century philanthropists
People from Adelaide
Officers of the Order of Australia
Australian media executives
Philanthropic organizations
2006 establishments in Australia
Boating accident deaths